The Girl from Everywhere is a 1927 American silent comedy film directed by Edward F. Cline and starring Daphne Pollard, Dot Farley, Mack Swain and Carole Lombard. The film, produced by Mack Sennett, is a parody of silent filmmaking, and showcases his "bathing beauties".

Cast
Daphne Pollard as Minnie Stitch
Dot Farley as Madame Zweibach
Mack Swain as Wilfred Ashcraft - Director
Carole Lombard as Vera Veranda - Miss Anybody 
Irving Bacon as The Casting Director
Roger Moore as Mr. Filbert - Actor 
Sterling Holloway as Assistant Director
Billy Bevan as Messenger
Andy Clyde as Publicity Man
Barney Hellum as Cameraman
Willy Castello as Arab Sheik
Carmelita Geraghty as Bathing Girl 
Ruth Hiatt as Mabel Smith 
Mary Ann Jackson as Bubbles Smith
Raymond McKee as Jimmy Smith

References

Bibliography
Munden, Kenneth White. The American Film Institute Catalog of Motion Pictures Produced in the United States, Part 1. University of California Press, 1997.

External links

1920s English-language films
1927 comedy films
American silent feature films
Silent American comedy films
American black-and-white films
Pathé Exchange films
Films directed by Edward F. Cline
1920s American films